Crestone Peak is the seventh-highest summit of the Rocky Mountains of North America and the U.S. state of Colorado. The prominent  fourteener is the highest summit of the Crestones and the second-highest summit in the Sangre de Cristo Range after Blanca Peak.

It shares its name with the nearby Crestone Needle, another fourteener of the Crestones. The Crestones are a cluster of high summits in the Sangre de Cristo Range, comprising Crestone Peak, Crestone Needle, Kit Carson Peak, Challenger Point, Humboldt Peak, and Columbia Point. They are usually accessed from common trailheads.

Climbing
Generally climbs of Crestone Peak or Crestone Needle start from a base camp at South Colony Lakes, east of the peak, accessed from the Wet Mountain Valley on the northeast side of the range. Then it ascends a long gully on the northwest side of Crestone Peak, which involves some rockfall danger (hence a climbing helmet is suggested). Crestone Peak is one of the more dangerous fourteener climbs in Colorado; accidents occur often in the Crestones, some caused by falls or lightning (a daily summer occurrence in the Sangre de Cristos).

Alternatively, the Cottonwood Creek route begins in the San Luis Valley and approaches the Crestones from the west. The route follows Cottonwood Creek to Cottonwood Lake. The trail starts out well defined, but after passing a south eastern tributary at approximately 11,1000ft it becomes faint, poorly maintained, and hard to follow for much of the upper route prior to rejoining the standard route from South Colony Lakes. From there, the South Face route of Crestone Peak is accessible.

From Crestone Peak, it is a mildly technical (Class 5—rope recommended) ridge scramble to the summit of Crestone Needle, similarly in the other direction. However, Crestone Peak and Crestone Needle are more commonly climbed separately.

See also

List of mountain peaks of North America
List of mountain peaks of the United States
List of mountain peaks of Colorado
List of Colorado county high points
List of Colorado fourteeners

Notes

References

External links

Crestone Peak on 14ers.com

Mountains of Colorado
Mountains of Custer County, Colorado
Mountains of Saguache County, Colorado
Fourteeners of Colorado
North American 4000 m summits
Sangre de Cristo Mountains